Dayan Leslie van der Westhuizen (born 5 April 1994 in Wellington, South Africa) is a South African rugby union player for the  in Super Rugby, the  in the Currie Cup and the  in the Rugby Challenge. His regular position is tighthead prop.

Career

Boland

Having grown up in Wellington in the Western Cape province in South Africa, Van der Westhuizen was selected to represent Border at the annual Under-16 Grant Khomo Week competition held in Upington, where he scored a try in their match against the Pumas.

Blue Bulls / Bulls

In 2012, he was called up to represent a South African Schools side and he played in three matches for them – against France, Wales and England. He scored a try in the first of those three matches to help South Africa achieve a 17–7 victory over their French counterparts.

He played in nine matches of the  side's 2013 Under-19 Provincial Championship season; the seven of those came during the regular season, during which the Blue Bulls won all twelve of their matches to top the log. Van der Westhuizen also scored his first try at this level in their match against  in a 46–16 victory, and a second in a win over the s. He was named in the starting line-up for the final against the s, a match which the Blue Bulls won 35–23 to secure the championship.

In 2014, Van der Westhuizen was included in the South Africa Under-20 squad that participated in the 2014 IRB Junior World Championship held in New Zealand. He played off the bench in their opening match against Scotland before making his first start for the Under-20s in a 33–24 victory against hosts and four-time winners New Zealand. He played off the bench once again for their final pool match, a 21–8 victory over Samoa as South Africa finished top of the group to set up a rematch with New Zealand in the semi-finals. Van der Westhuizen started the semi-final and helped South Africa secure their fourth consecutive victory over New Zealand at this level, winning 32–25. He made his fifth appearance – and third start – of the tournament in the final, but could not prevent South Africa finishing on the losing side this time, with England winning the championship for the second consecutive year with a 21–20 victory over South Africa.

Van der Westhuizen returned to domestic action a month after the Junior World Championship, making ten appearances for the s during the 2014 Under-21 Provincial Championship and scoring a try against the  team as they reached the final of the competition, with Van der Westhuizen coming on as a second-half replacement to help the Blue Bulls win the title by beating  in the final.

He was named in a Varsity Cup Dream Team at the conclusion of the tournament which played one match against the South Africa Under-20s in Stellenbosch.

References

South African rugby union players
Living people
1994 births
People from Wellington, Western Cape
Rugby union props
Blue Bulls players
Bulls (rugby union) players
South Africa Under-20 international rugby union players
Southern Kings players
Hino Red Dolphins players
Rugby union players from the Western Cape